Alberto Saichann is a comic book artist and penciller born in Argentina.

He has worked for Marvel Comics (Punisher: Return to the Big Nothing, Punisher War Zone) and DC Comics (Looney Tunes).

References

Living people
Place of birth missing (living people)
Argentine comics artists
Year of birth missing (living people)